Lorus Bishop Pratt (November 27, 1855, Tooele, Utah – December 29, 1923, Salt Lake City) was an American landscape painter and missionary. In 1890, he was one of a group of painters who studied in Paris under the sponsorship of the Church of Jesus Christ of Latter-day Saints (LDS Church), in preparation for painting murals at the nearly completed Salt Lake Temple.

Biography 
Pratt's father was Orson Pratt, an early LDS Church member who became one of its leading theologians. He studied art at the University of Deseret (now the University of Utah) with Dan Weggeland and George M. Ottinger, who encouraged him to further his studies in New York and Philadelphia. 

After missions in Pennsylvania and Missouri, he made his first visit to Europe in 1879, when he was called to serve at the LDS mission in England, which was led by his father, and assisted  in organizing the current chapter and verse arrangement in the official LDS Church edition of the Book of Mormon. He returned to Europe in 1885, visiting Paris with his wife and children.

In 1890, together with John Fairbanks, John Hafen and Edwin Evans, Pratt was awarded a two-year scholarship to study at the Académie Julian in Paris, where their primary instructor was Albert Rigolot, and they became known as the "French Art Missionaries". While on this assignment, he held the position of president of the French Mission. Trips to the countryside to paint in plein aire inspired him to focus on paintings featuring harvests and agricultural workers. Upon their return, they executed the murals and frescoes for the Salt Lake Temple, which was completed in 1893. He was also involved in creating the artwork in the St. George Temple, Manti Temple and Logan Temple.

Pratt's non-Church artwork found little acceptance, and some of his paintings were used to settle debts. He farmed and, for many years, also taught English at the University of Utah.

References

Further reading
Robert Olpin, Thomas Rugh; Painters of the Wasatch Mountains, Salt Lake City, Gibbs Smith, Publisher, 2005 
Robert Olpin, Donna Poulton, Vern Swanson; Utah art, Utah artists : 150 year survey, Layton, Gibbs Smith, 2001

External links

Documents relating to Lorus Pratt and his wife @ the Jared Pratt Family Association website.

1855 births
1923 deaths
American artists
American leaders of the Church of Jesus Christ of Latter-day Saints
American Mormon missionaries in France
Latter Day Saint artists
Mission presidents (LDS Church)
American Mormon missionaries in England
American Mormon missionaries in the United States
Pratt family (Latter-day Saints)
University of Utah faculty
19th-century Mormon missionaries
People from Tooele, Utah